Robert Tait Smith (23 November 1877 – 25 February 1939) was an Australian rules footballer who played with Fitzroy in the Victorian Football League.

References
 Holmesby, Russell & Main, Jim (2009). The Encyclopedia of AFL Footballers. 8th ed. Melbourne: Bas Publishing.

External links

1877 births
1939 deaths
Australian rules footballers from Victoria (Australia)
Australian Rules footballers: place kick exponents
Fitzroy Football Club players